Mullapudi Harischandra Prasad, (28 July 1921 – 3 September 2011) was an Indian politician and industrialist from Andhra Pradesh. He was the chairman and managing director of the Andhra Sugars Group and also the managing director of Andhra Petrochemicals and the President of the Federation of Andhra Pradesh Chambers of Commerce and Industry (FAPCCI). He started Andhra Sugars in 1947 – one of the first industries set up in Independent India and hence called "Andhra Birla". He established the first aspirin factory in India and created a rocket fuel unit that supplied to Indian Space Research Organisation.

He was originally from the town of Tanuku in Andhra Pradesh, born to Mullapudi Thimmaraju and Venkataramanamma, from a Kamma Zamindar family.

Prasad was elected twice as a member of the Andhra Pradesh Legislative Assembly representing the Indian National Congress. Later when the Telugu Desam Party was formed he is known to have played a key role in the party.

Prasad set up educational and medical trusts. He played an important role in establishing Rangaraya Medical College, Kakinada, Andhra Pradesh and SMVM Polytechnic, Tanuku, Andhra Pradesh. He also established Mullapudi Venkata Ramanamma Memorial Hospital and Research Centre in Tanuku, Andhra Pradesh.

Professional career
Chairman and managing director, Andhra Sugars Limited
Executive Director, Andhra Petrochemicals Limited, Visakhapatnam
managing director, Andhra Chemicals Corporation
Director, Elecon Engineering Co. Ltd. Vallabh Vidyanagar
Director, Andhra Foundry & Machine Tools Ltd.
Chairman, Jayalakshmi Oil and Chemical Industries Limited (Jocil Ltd.)
Chairman and managing director, Sree Satyanarayana Spinning Mills Ltd, Tanuku
Jayalakshmi Fertilizers
Chairman, Sree Akkamamba Textiles Ltd.

Political career
Secretary in the AP Congress Committee from 1946 to 1955
Member of state Legislative Council in Common Madras in 1952
Elected MLA from Tanuku twice in 1955 and 1961
First chairman of the Tanuku municipality in 1981

Awards and honours
Honorary Doctorate by Nagarjuna University
U.B. Raghavendra Rao Memorial Award
President, Federation of Andhra Pradesh Chambers of Commerce and Industry (FAPCCI)
Lifetime Achievement Award at Z24 hours Telugu news channel's Industrial Awards
Telugu Thalli award from Government of Andhra Pradesh

References

External links
 Andhra Sugars Website
 Andhra Petro-Chemicals Website

Telugu people
2011 deaths
1921 births
Businesspeople from Andhra Pradesh
People from West Godavari district